Enrique Tovar may refer to:

 Enrique Tovar Ávalos, Mexican film director
 Enrique Tovar (boxer) (born 1935), Venezuelan boxer